Casa Loma is a historic house in Toronto, Canada.

Casa Loma may also refer to:

 Casa Loma (neighbourhood), in Toronto
 Casa Loma, Kern County, California
 Casa Loma, Placer County, California
 Casa Loma, Santa Clara County, California